Csókás may refer to:

 Csókás, the Hungarian name for Ciocaşu village, Vințu de Jos Commune, Alba County, Romania
 Csókás, the Hungarian name for Ciocotiş village, Cernești Commune, Maramureș County, Romania
 Csókás-patak, the Hungarian name of the Stăuini River, Alba County, Romania

People with the surname
 Marton Csokas (born 1966), New Zealand film and television actor

See also 
 Csóka (disambiguation)

Hungarian-language surnames